The 2015 Nigerian Senate election in Ondo State was held on March 28, 2015, to elect members of the Nigerian Senate to represent Ondo State. Omotayo Donald representing Ondo Central and Robert Ajayi Boroffice representing Ondo North won on the platform of All Progressives Congress, while Yele Omogunwa representing Ondo South won on the platform of Peoples Democratic Party.

Overview

Summary

Results

Ondo Central 
All Progressives Congress candidate Omotayo Donald won the election, defeating People's Democratic Party candidate Akinyelure Ayo and other party candidates.

Ondo North 
All Progressives Congress candidate Robert Ajayi Boroffice won the election, defeating People's Democratic Party candidate Bode Olajumoke and other party candidates.

Ondo South 
Peoples Democratic Party candidate Yele Omogunwa won the election, defeating All Progressives Congress candidate Morayo Lebi and other party candidates.

References 

Ondo State Senate elections
March 2015 events in Nigeria
Ond